Moraleja, municipality in the province of Cáceres, Extremadura, Spain
Moraleja de Enmedio, municipality in the community of Madrid, Spain
Moraleja de Matacabras, municipality in the province of Ávila, Spain
Moraleja de las Panaderas, municipality in the community of Madrid, Spain
Moraleja del Vino, municipality in the province of Zamora, Spain
Moraleja de Sayago, municipality in the province of Ávila, Spain
Moraleja de Coca, a village in the municipality of Nava de la Asunción, province of Segovia, Spain